Ting Tong is a 2020 Indian animated television series directed by Shubra Chakraborty and Vijay Raibole for Nickelodeon India. It is a spin-off created around a character named Ting Tong from Gattu Battu, a Nickelodeon original series. The series is produced by Fable Spinners Studio and distributed by Viacom 18. It was premiered on September 28, 2020.

Synopsis 
The series is a spin-off made around a character named Ting Tong from the well-known series called Gattu Battu. The story revolves around the daily adventures of fun and adorable character named Ting Tong who has a temporary memory loss issue and transforms into whatever character he sees before him when he loses his memory which transforms him into an accidental hero of the town comically catching bad guys.

Cast 

 Sourav Chakraborty as Ting Tong
 Parminder Ghumman as Single Dose
 Aaditya Raj as Double Dose 
 Sudhir Rewadi as Meeru
 Ghanshyam Shukla as Khoonkhar Singh

Characters 
 Ting Tong: He is a simple, innocent, and grounded character. He has long hair falling over his eyes covering his vision consistently because of which he can't see where he is going and often ends up banging into walls, tumbling off steps, slipping of banana peels, etc. yet that isn't all. Each time something hits his head, he loses his memory temporarily. In addition to the fact that he loses his memory, he likewise changes totally into any character available before him in that occasion, soaking up all the characteristics; be it a human or a creature. His memory doesn't restore except if his head is hit once more.
 Single Dose: He is one of the two thug siblings in Ting Tong's town. They are consistently up to some mischief. Single Dose is infamous and is the super psyche between the two. Single Dose spends all his time planning and plotting mischief/robbery. He is thin and just 3 feet tall. He is very talkative and is the leader amongst the duo.
 Double Dose: Unlike his sibling Single Dose, he is tall and physically well built. However, what he makes up for in height and body, Double Dose lacks in brains and energy. He is a character who is quite dumb and lazy, who hardly speaks, even if he does, he talks slowly. He is frequently seen around following his brother Single Dose's orders and carrying out his plans only to goof up.
 Meeru: Meeru is Ting Tong's pet and friend. Meeru is faithful to Ting Tong and their friendship is unbreakable. Meeru is the one who deals with Ting Tong when he loses memory and makes a decent attempt to take his memory back to avoid misadventures, however hilariously fails to do so. He has a Hyderabadi accent. He generally refers to himself as Nanhi si Jaan (Little sweetheart) at whatever point he is in a difficult situation.
 Khoonkhar Singh: He is the Police inspector of the town with Hoshiyaar Singh as his sergeant. He is always late at the incident, always trying to catch the Dose brothers (goons). His accent is that of Shatrughan Sinha.
 Hoshiyaar Singh: He is the sergeant (police) of the town. He is faithful to inspector Khoonkhar Singh. He is goofy.
 Wring Wrong: He is the mad scientist, arrogant and over-confident on his intelligence, who is friends with Dose brothers. He has the capability to invent things. However, he is a lot of interested with Ting Tong's capacity to change into anything. Ting Tong hurts Wring Wrong's ego, therefore he wants to make him his research project.

Broadcast 
 The series is being aired on Nickelodeon Sonic since September 2020.
 It aired on Nickelodeon Sonic Monday through Friday at 9a.m

See also 
 Gattu Battu

References

External links 
 
 Official website

2020 Indian television series debuts
Indian children's animated comedy television series
Nickelodeon (Indian TV channel) original programming
Hindi-language Nickelodeon original programming
Animated television series about children
Indian television spin-offs